David Hearn (born June 17, 1979) is a Canadian professional golfer who plays on the PGA Tour. He has also played on the  Nationwide Tour, Canadian Tour and the Asian Tour.

Hearn was born in Brampton, Ontario. He attended the University of Wyoming, where he played on the golf team. He was a member of the winning Canadian team at the 2001 Four Nations Cup tournament, and played out of the Brantford Golf and Country Club as an amateur.

Hearn turned professional late in 2001. He was named the Canadian Tour Rookie of the Year in 2002. Hearn made his first cut in a major championship at the 2013 U.S. Open, finishing tied for 21st.

In June 2013, Hearn finished in a tie for second at the John Deere Classic, after losing in a three-man playoff, which also included Zach Johnson and Jordan Spieth. After all three players had parred the first and second extra holes, Hearn had two opportunities at the third and fourth extra holes to seal the win, but could not hole either of the makeable putts. The playoff ended at the fifth extra hole when Spieth made par to Hearn and Johnson's bogeys. This was Hearn's best finish to date on the PGA Tour, beating his previous tie for fifth at the 2011 Shriners Hospitals for Children Open.

Hearn lost another sudden-death playoff in July 2015, at the Greenbrier Classic. He had a putt at the 72nd hole to win the tournament outright but left the 20-footer short of the cup. In the four-man playoff, Danny Lee and Hearn holed birdie putts at the first extra hole to eliminate Kevin Kisner and Robert Streb who both missed the green at the par three. Then on the second extra hole, Hearn found trouble off his drive and could only bogey the par five, allowing Lee to claim victory with a two-putt par. This was Hearn's second runner-up finish on the PGA Tour, losing both times in playoffs.

At the RBC Canadian Open in July 2015, Hearn held the 54-hole lead at 15-under-par, with a two-stroke advantage over Jason Day and Bubba Watson. He entered the final round with a chance to become the first home-winner of the event in 61 years and win his first PGA Tour event, but finished the day in solo third behind Day, the winner, and Watson after a level-par round of 72.

Professional wins (2)

Nationwide Tour wins (1)

Canadian Tour wins (1)

Playoff record
PGA Tour playoff record (0–2)

Results in major championships

CUT = missed the half-way cut
"T" indicates a tie for a place

Results in The Players Championship

"T" indicates a tie for a place

Team appearances
Professional
World Cup (representing Canada): 2013, 2016

See also
2004 PGA Tour Qualifying School graduates
2010 Nationwide Tour graduates
2019 Korn Ferry Tour Finals graduates

References

External links

David Hearn profile at Canadian Golfer

Canadian male golfers
PGA Tour golfers
Olympic golfers of Canada
Golfers at the 2016 Summer Olympics
Korn Ferry Tour graduates
Golfing people from Ontario
Wyoming Cowboys and Cowgirls athletes
Sportspeople from Brampton
Sportspeople from Brantford
1979 births
Living people